Garminge is a village in the Dutch province of Drenthe. It is a part of the municipality of Midden-Drenthe, and lies about 15 km northeast of Hoogeveen.

It was first mentioned in 1362 as Gharminge, and means "the descendants of Garm". Garm is an old Dutch first name generally just used in the northern provinces Drenthe, Groningen and Friesland.

Garminge was home to 97 people in 1840.

References

Midden-Drenthe
Populated places in Drenthe